Duck was launched in Boston in 1804, presumably under another name. She was taken in prize in 1812 and became a British merchantman. She spent much of her career sailing between Britain and Newfoundland. In 1813 French frigates captured her, but released her. She was wrecked on 15 October 1829.

Career
Duck first appeared in Lloyd's Register (LR) in the supplementary pages to the volume for 1812.

The French burnt eight, that is, all but , Davenport, master, and Duck, Silly, master. They removed Brilliants crew and abandoned her at sea; the frigate  found her floating and brought her into Plymouth. The French put all their prisoners on Duck and released her. She arrived at the Isle of Scilly on 4 January 1814.

 was wrecked on 4 September 1823 on the coast of Newfoundland while sailing from Quebec City to Halifax, Nova Scotia. Duck took her cargo, soldiers' clothing, from Newfoundland to Quebec.

Fate
On 15 October 1829 a gale drove Duck, of London, Meek, master, on shore at Stanton Sands. She was one of several driven onto the beach. A later report stated that the other vessels were expected to be gotten off, but that Duck was breaking up.

Citations

1812 ships
Ships built in Boston
Captured ships
Age of Sail merchant ships of England
Maritime incidents in October 1829